Adam Nayyar (December 10, 1948, in Bahawalpur – July 29, 2008, in Islamabad) was a Pakistani anthropologist, author and ethnomusicologist. He served the Lok Virsa for twenty years as a Director Research. He was the acting executive director of Pakistan National Council of the Arts (PNCA) when he died.

Early life 
Nayyar was born in 1948 in Bahawalpur. He studied Cultural anthropology at the University of Heidelberg, Germany.

Career 
He was also the faculty of the Quaid-e-Azam University, Islamabad.

Death 
Nayyar died on July 29, 2008, in Islamabad due to cancer of lymph nodes.

References 

1948 births
2008 deaths
Pakistani anthropologists
Pakistani writers
Ethnomusicologists
Pakistani writers about music
People from Islamabad
People from Bahawalpur
Punjabi people
20th-century musicologists
20th-century anthropologists